The 2017 Toulon Tournament (officially ) was the 45th edition of the Toulon Tournament. The tournament was named after Maurice Revello, who started the tournament in 1967 and died in 2016. It was held in the department of Bouches-du-Rhône from 29 May to 10 June 2017. The 2017 edition was the first to feature 12 teams.

The tournament was won by the defending champions England, who claimed their sixth title, beating Ivory Coast 5–3 in a penalty shootout after the game ended 1–1.

Participants
Twelve participating teams were announced on April 12, 2017.

AFC
 (1st participation)
 (1st participation)
 (12th participation)
CAF
 (3rd participation)
 (9th participation)
CONCACAF
 (1st participation)

CONMEBOL
 (16th participation)
UEFA
 (5th participation)
TH (19th participation)
 (40th participation)
 (8th participation)
 (1st participation)

Squads

The twelve national teams involved in the tournament were required to register a squad of 20 Under-20 players.

Venues
A total of four cities hosted the tournament.

Match officials
The referees were:

 Hélder Martins de Carvalho and António Muachihuissa Caxala
Assistants: Estanislau Guedes Prata
 Pavel Orel
Assistants: Jakub Hrabovský and Tomáš Mokrusch
 Karim Abed
Assistants: Mehdi Rahmouni and Benjamin Pagès
 Anastasios Papapetrou
Assistants: Ioannis Toumpakaris and Tryfon Petropoulos

 Yusuke Araki
Assistants: Toshiyuki Tanaka and Jun Mihara
 Alan Mario Sant
Assistants: Luke Portelli and Christopher Lawrence Francalanza
 Radu Petrescu
Assistants: Vasile Marinescu and Radu-Adrian-Ştefan Ghinguleac
 Don Robertson
Assistants: Jordan Stokoe and Dougie Potter

Matches rules
Every match consisted of two periods of 40 minutes each. In a match, every team had nine named substitutes and the maximum number of substitutions permitted was four.In the knockout stage, if a game tied at the end of regulation time, extra time would not be played and the penalty shoot-out would be used to determine the winner.

Group stage
The draw was held on 15 April 2017. The twelve teams were drawn into three groups of four. The group winners and the best second-placed team qualified for the semi-finals. The Group stage was played from 29 May to 6 June 2017.

Group A

Group B

Group C

Knockout stage
The knockout stage was played on 8 and 10 June 2017.

Semi-finals

Third place playoff

Final

Goalscorers
61 goals were scored in 22 matches, for an average of  goals per match.
4 goals

 Chico Banza
 Harvey Barnes
 George Hirst

3 goals
 Ryan Hardie
2 goals

 Ondřej Šašinka
 David Brooks
 Martell Taylor-Crossdale
 Bilal Boutobba
 Jean-Philippe Krasso
 Jean Thierry Lazare
 Oliver Burke
 George Thomas

1 goal

 Rui
 Vá
 Abdulaziz Khalid
 Gabriel Novaes
 Rolando Oviedo
 Eduardo Puga
 Lázaro Tuero
 Ondřej Chvěja
 Martin Graiciar
 Roman Kašiar
 Ondřej Novotný
 Elliot Embleton
 Iké Ugbo
 Yanis Barka
 Vincent Marcel
 Jean-Philippe Mateta
 Arnaud Nordin
 Derick Osei
 Hanis Sagara Putra
 Wilfried Gnoukouri
 Aké Arnaud Loba
 Christ Tiéhi
 Kader Touré Yaya
 Mizuki Ando
 Hiroki Ito
 Takumi Sasaki
 Greg Taylor
 Craig Wighton
 Daniel James

Own goal
 Denis Granečný (playing against Scotland)

Awards

Individual awards
After the final, the following players were rewarded for their performances during the competition.
Best player:  David Brooks
Second best player:  Joe Worrall
Third best player:  Jean Thierry Lazare
Fourth best player:  Greg Taylor
Breakthrough player:  Egy Maulana
Best goalkeeper:  Luke Pilling
Younger player of the final:  Reece James
Best goal of the tournament:  Hiroki Ito (playing against Cuba)
Fair-Play:

Best XI
The best XI team was a squad consisting of the eleven most impressive players at the tournament.

References

External links

Toulon Tournament

 
2017
2016–17 in French football

2017 in youth association football
May 2017 sports events in France
June 2017 sports events in France